Centropolis is an unincorporated community in Franklin County, Kansas, United States.  As of the 2020 census, the population of the community and nearby areas was 100.  It is located about 11 miles northwest of Ottawa.  In the 1850s, Centropolis had the distinction of briefly vying for territorial capital of Kansas.

History
The area was first settled by Perry Fuller in 1855 who established a store in order to trade with the nearby Ottawa Indians. His store prospered and in 1856 he established the Centropolis Town Company and began selling lots.  The community name is a portmanteau of central and metropolis. A missionary newspaper published by Jotham Meeker for the Ottawa Baptist Mission was the first newspaper in Franklin County. The first commercial newspaper in the County, the Kansas Leader, was founded in 1857. Not only did Fuller expect his new town to become county seat but also the territorial capital of Kansas and eventually state capital.

Just a couple miles east of Centropolis, St. Bernard was established and the Territorial Legislature made St. Bernard the Franklin County seat but despite having the county seat, St. Bernard did not grow and post office was closed and renamed Minneola.

The Centropolis post office closed in 1930.

Geography

Demographics

For statistical purposes, the United States Census Bureau has defined this community as a census-designated place (CDP).

References

Further reading

External links
 Franklin County maps: Current, Historic, KDOT

Unincorporated communities in Franklin County, Kansas
Unincorporated communities in Kansas
Capitals of Kansas